Claudius Marioton (2 February 1844-1919) was a French sculptor.

Life

The eldest child of the cook Jean Marioton and the metal-browner Catherine Magister, Claudius had two younger brothers who were also artists - the sculptor Eugène Marioton and the painter Jean Alfred Marioton. He exhibited at every Paris Salon from 1873 onwards, winning an honorary mention each year from 1879 to 1882, a 3rd class medal in 1883 and a 2nd class medal (outside the competition) in 1885. His first exhibit was 'Le Plaisir' (Pleasure; plaster #6514) and Love Making the World Turn According to His Pleasure (bronze #6515) at the 1879 Salon. He also won laureates in the Willemsens and Crozatier competitions in 1876 and 1879 respectively. In 1886, he decorated Carrier-Belleuse's cup (Musée d'Orsay) 

He won two gold medals and one silver medal at the 1889 Exposition Universelle. He was on the sculpture jury at the 'salon des Champs-Élysées' in 1893 and 1894. In 1894 he produced 'Byzance' (Byzantium) in gold and silver, The Satyr, a steel bas-relief with lapis lazuli inlay, and 'L'offensive et Défensive' (The Offensive and the Defensive, a silver, gold and colour diptych). He won the collective firsts prize at the Lyon Exposition Universelle in 1894 and the following year was made a knight of the Ordre national de la Légion d'honneur. He was also a member of the overseeing committee of the École Boulle and director of the 'école de dessin de modelage et de ciselure de la réunion des fabricants de bronze' in Paris.

References

External links
 

1844 births
1919 deaths
19th-century French sculptors
French male sculptors
20th-century French sculptors
Chevaliers of the Légion d'honneur
19th-century French male artists